The Hale Solar Laboratory is a historic astronomical observatory in Pasadena, Los Angeles County, California, United States.  Built in 1923, it was the laboratory of astronomer George Ellery Hale (1868-1938), a pioneering figure in the development of the discipline of astrophysics in the United States.  The building, a distinctive blend of Mission Revival and Spanish Colonial Revival styles, was designated a National Historic Landmark in 1989.

Description
The Hale Solar Laboratory is located in a residential area on private property south of the campus of the California Institute of Technology, on the east side of Holladay Road between Lombardy and Orlando Roads.  It is set well back from the street, down a narrow tree-lined lane.  It is a roughly T-shaped concrete structure, with a tile roof.  The stem of the T consists of the telescope tower and Hale's library/office and living area, while the top portion of the T historically housed electrical and ventilation equipment.  The main entrance is at the base of the tower, set in an arch above which is an incised bas-relief tribute to Akhenaten, the Egyptian pharaoh who worshipped the sun god Aten.

History
The observatory was designed by Reginald Davis Johnson (1882 - 1952), Gordon Kaufmann (1888–1949), and Roland Coate (1890-1958) and was completed in 1923. The site's landscape master plan and gardens were designed by Beatrix Farrand.

After retiring as director at the Mount Wilson Observatory, George Ellery Hale built the Hale Solar Laboratory as his office and workshop, pursuing his interest in the sun.  The observatory was where Hale refined the spectrohelioscope, making it possible to perform detailed observations of the surface of the sun.  Hale's other wide-ranging contributions to the sciences include the founding of the International Astronomical Union, the Astrophysical Journal, and instrumental contributions to the founding of the California Institute of Technology.

Landmark
The Hale Solar Laboratory was declared a National Historic Landmark in 1989.

See also
History of Pasadena, California
List of National Historic Landmarks in California
National Register of Historic Places listings in Pasadena, California

References

External links
 National Park Service summary: Hale Solar Laboratory
 Palomar Skies: "A Visit to the Hale Solar Laboratory" -  (2009 article)

Solar telescopes
Astronomical observatories in California
Buildings and structures in Pasadena, California
History of Los Angeles County, California
Buildings and structures on the National Register of Historic Places in Pasadena, California
National Historic Landmarks in California
Mission Revival architecture in California
Spanish Colonial Revival architecture in California